Aporocidaris incerta is a species of sea urchin of the family Ctenocidaridae. It is placed in the genus Aporocidaris and lives in the deep sea. Aporocidaris incerta was first scientifically described in 1902 by Koehler.

Description
The primary spines are as long as the test is wide. When preserved, this species is dark brown.

See also 
 Aporocidaris eltaniana
 Aporocidaris fragilis
 Aporocidaris milleri

References 

Ctenocidaridae
Animals described in 1902